Mariee Sioux (born February 4, 1985) is an American folk singer-songwriter.

Biography
Her father Gary Sobonya is a mandolin player of Polish and Hungarian descent, and her mother Felicia is of Spanish, Paiute, and Indigenous Mexican descent. Sioux grew up in Nevada City, California, where she wrote verses since she was a young child. At 17, she traveled to Patagonia to volunteer at a school for indigenous children where she taught herself to play the guitar, and in 2006 she debuted her first self-released album A Bundled Bundle of Bundles. A year later, in 2007, she released her first studio album Faces in the Rocks which featured her delicate acoustic guitar music alongside the Native American flute by Gentle Thunder, and mandolin played by her father Gary Sobonya. The album had a Native American theme to it, filled with references to nature and the Native American people. Since the debut of her first album, she has drawn comparisons from Joanna Newsom to Joni Mitchell, and she has toured through North America and Europe.

She released a cover version of The Cure's "Lovesong" on the 2008 tribute record to The Cure, entitled Perfect as Cats.

Gift for the End
Gift for the End, Mariee Sioux's second album, was recorded between April 2010 and August 2011 in Placerville's Monsoon Studios and in the Nevada City's Sun Dial studios. Guest musicians were mostly friends and family members, and it was produced and arranged by Mariee's partner Sean Kae.

A review on allmusic.com commented positively on influences from Joanna Newsom, Bert Jansch, and Nick Drake.

Gift for the End was released in Europe on March 5, 2012, on the Almost Musique label, and in the USA in April 2012 on Whale Watch Records.

Discography
Pray Me A Shadow (self released, 2004)
A Bundled Bundle of Bundles (self released, 2006)
Faces in the Rocks (Grass Roots Records, 2007)
Two Tongues at One Time/Buried in Teeth 7" (Grass Roots Records, 2007)
Gift for the End (Almost Musique Records, 2012)
Bonnie & Mariee (Spiritual Pajamas, 2012)
Grief in Exile (Night Bloom Records, 2019)

References

External links

Mariee Sioux on Whale Watch Records
Mariee Sioux Official Myspace Page
Mariee Sioux Last.fm Page
 Live video Event #16: Mariee Sioux + Jullian Angel February 12, 2009, Rouen, France
 Acoustic session  for Europe and co Rouen, France
Mariee Sioux on Almost Musique
Official Tumblr

Living people
1985 births
American folk singers
New Weird America
Paiute people
People from Nevada City, California
Psychedelic folk musicians
Songwriters from California
American people of Indigenous Mexican descent
American people who self-identify as being of Native American descent
American people of Spanish descent
American people of Polish descent
American people of Hungarian descent
Singers from California
21st-century American singers
21st-century American women singers
American people of Paiute descent